London based Arsenal Football Club has developed a very strong following since its founding in 1886. Since the 1980s, Arsenal's fans have often been referred to as Gooners, a derivation from the team's nickname, the "Gunners".

Many fanzines, blogs, podcasts and fans websites have been dedicated to the club and the fans have long-standing rivalries with several other clubs; the most notable of which is with near neighbours Tottenham Hotspur, with whom they regularly contest the North London derby.

The club and the fans have regularly featured in portrayals of football in British culture but Arsenal fans come from far and wide; a 2005 report estimated Arsenal's global fanbase at 112 million, the third-largest in the world. A September 2011 report estimated Arsenal's fanbase at 100 million worldwide, still making them the third-largest team in terms of supporters.

Arsenal fans have long been stereotyped for the dissatisfaction they appear to feel – and express – towards their club. Sometimes the regular low-level grumbling will erupt, with severe criticisms and bitter feelings being aired. An example of this in the 2010s was a vociferous group – dubbed "The Anti-Arsenal Arsenal" – that had manager Arsène Wenger as the principle target of their dissatisfactions. However, the perception of Arsenal fans as being hard to please is an old one. Even at times of success antagonism was noted. Such was the experience of the title winning teams of 1953 and 1971. Not even the figure behind the successful 1930s team successes was spared: Herbert Chapman complained of the activities of the "boo-boys" and title-winning manager George Graham was strongly criticised over choice of players and tactical strategy.

In 2010, Arsenal supporters became the first fans of a Premier League club able to buy percentages of a stake in Arsenal through a "fanshare" scheme, therefore giving them rights to attend shareholders meetings.

Demographics
Arsenal's performance in home matches have resulted in them having the second-highest average League attendance for an English club during the 2007–08 season, (60,069, which was 99.5% of available capacity), and as of 2006, the fourth-highest all-time average attendance. Arsenal have the highest proportion (7.7%) of non-white attending supporters of any club in English football, according to a 2002 report.

There are supporters' clubs worldwide. A 2005 report by Granada Ventures, which at the time owned a 9.9% stake in the club, estimated Arsenal's global fanbase at 27 million, the third-largest in the world.

The club's north London location, adjoining socially wealthy areas such as Canonbury and Barnsbury, mixed areas such as Islington, Holloway, Highbury, and the adjacent London Borough of Camden, and largely working-class areas such as Finsbury Park and Stoke Newington, as well as neighbouring Homerton, Clapton and Dalston, has meant that Arsenal's supporters have typically come from across the usual class divides. Much of the Afro-Caribbean support comes from the neighbouring London Borough of Hackney and a large portion of the South Asian Arsenal supporters travel to the stadium from Wembley and Harrow, in the north west of the capital. The NW London areas of Edgware, Hendon and Barnet are home to many of the club's Jewish supporters, who are also among the many Arsenal fans from adjacent Hertfordshire towns such as Borehamwood.

Songs
In addition to the usual English football chants, Arsenal's supporters sing "One-Nil to the Arsenal" (to the tune of "Go West") and also regularly sing "Who's that team they call the Arsenal", "Good Old Arsenal" (to the tune of "Rule, Britannia!") and "We're the North Bank/Clock End Highbury". The fans also chant "Boring, Boring Arsenal" in self-deprecating reference to Arsenal's reputation during the 1970s and 1980s as an overly defensive, cautious team. The team's new (May 2022) anthem is The Angel (North London Forever) by Louis Dunford.

Rivalries
Arsenal's longest-running and deepest rivalry is with their nearest major neighbours, Tottenham Hotspur, with matches between the two being referred to as the North London derby.

Arsenal also have a rivalry with West London club Chelsea, which is also considered a major derby. In addition, a strong on-pitch rivalry with Manchester United dates back to the late 1980s, which intensified in the 1990s as both clubs began often competing for the Premier League title.

A 2003 online survey found that Arsenal supporters most dislike Tottenham, followed by Manchester United and Chelsea, although both Chelsea and Spurs fans see Arsenal as their main rival.

Traditions

St. Totteringham's Day
Saint Totteringham's Day is a concept created in 2002 and first published on the fan website arseweb.com. It is the day when Arsenal have gathered sufficient points to be mathematically assured to finish ahead of Tottenham in the league table. In 2007, the concept was first mentioned (mistakenly as 'St. Totteridge') in an Arsenal official match programme although there are suggestions that it has existed since 2005. St. Totteringham's day 2010 was the first time the celebration was acknowledged by mainstream media, with mentions from the BBC, and The Guardian newspapers.

The unofficial 'holiday' has not occurred since 2016; Spurs' 2–0 win over Arsenal in April 2017 ensured that Tottenham would finish above Arsenal in the league for the first time in 22 years.

Yellow ribbon symbolism
Wearing a yellow ribbon, or symbolism pertaining to yellow ribbons or the colour yellow is a tradition often associated with Arsenal playing at Wembley Stadium (or other cup finals). It is thought to have originated in the 1950s and 70s, when Arsenal had considerable successes reaching the FA Cup Final. As a nod to Arsenal's iconic yellow kit used, fans sang a rendition of "Round Her Neck She Wears a Yeller Ribbon" as a chant. Originally, a US war poem, first published in 1917, it was popularised in 1949 by the film, 'She Wore a Yellow Ribbon' starring John Wayne, where the Andrews Sisters performed the song. Since then, it has been established into fan folklore.

Controversies 
Arsenal supporters enjoy good relations with police forces around the country and especially the Metropolitan Police. The club and authorities work closely together to police fans, with both using their available powers where necessary.

Arsenal fans have been involved in a number of incidents of racist and homophobic abuse at matches over the years. They have been accused of making homophobic and racist chants and materials directed at ex-Arsenal left-back Ashley Cole. In 2018, Arsenal announced an investigation into "discriminatory and violent" behaviour by fans during a match against rivals Tottenham Hotspur. Fans were alleged to have hissed (a reference to the gas chambers using during the Holocaust) and chanted about "gassing Jews". Antisemitic abuse has been a longstanding issue at matches involving Arsenal and Tottenham, as the latter have historic links with North London's Jewish community. Fans have also come under fire for continued use of the word "Yid" in chants.

A 2021 investigation found that Granit Xhaka had been racially abused by Arsenal season ticket holders online. The same study found that Hector Bellerin was targeted with homophobic abuse. Former Arsenal player Emmanuel Adebayor claimed he was racially abused by fans with a chant about his dad washing elephants after he transferred to Manchester City. In 2019 Arsenal announced an investigation into racist abuse directed at Napoli player Kalidou Koulibaly after a Snapchat video shot during the Europa League match showed a fan using the n-word; the club pledged to find and ban the culprit. An Arsenal Fan TV pundit was dismissed from the channel after he referred to South Korean Tottenham player Son Heung-min as a "DVD", a racial slur that is a reference to selling illegal discs. Wilfried Zaha of Crystal Palace said he received racist abuse and threats to his family on social media after he was accused of diving to win a penalty during a 2–2 draw with Arsenal. In February 2013 the Football Association launched a probe into allegations that an Arsenal fan had racially abused Newcastle United's Cheick Tiote.

Fans of Arsenal and Manchester United were singled out for criticism after being recorded chanting sexist abuse at Chelsea's female club doctor Eva Carneiro during matches.

Notable supporters

Below is a list of well-known people who are known Arsenal supporters:

Royalty
Elizabeth II
Olav V of Norway

Entertainment

Actors and actresses

David Ajala
Hugh Laurie
Adewale Akinnuoye-Agbaje
Alfie Allen
Dane Baptiste
Jamie Bell
Paul Blackthorne
Louise Brealey
Saffron Burrows
Asa Butterfield
John Challis
Gemma Chan
Jackie Chan
Joan Collins
Kevin Costner
Charlie Cox
Benedict Cumberbatch
Phil Davis
Rosario Dawson
Danny DeVito
Adrian Dunbar
Idris Elba
Tom Ellis
Tom Felton
Colin Firth
Matthew Fox
Jamie Foxx
Andrew Garfield
Rupert Graves
Esha Gupta
Ben Hardy
Brendan Hunt
Charlie Heaton
Natalia Dyer
Maddy Hill
Bradley James
Daniel Kaluuya
Gary Kemp
Martin Kemp
Val Kilmer
Matt Lucas
Kate Mara
Neil Maskell
Tobias Menzies
Jonathan Rhys Meyers
Demi Moore
Shemar Moore
Deepika Padukone
Alan Parker
Disha Patani
Robert Pattinson
Anna Popplewell
Will Poulter
Freddie Prinze Jr.
Keanu Reeves
Harry Reid
Daisy Ridley
Patrick Robinson
Tom Rosenthal
David Schneider
David Schwimmer
Kaya Scodelario
Andy Serkis
Ranveer Singh
Kyle Soller
David Soul
Dan Stevens
Mark Strong
Gregg Sulkin
Bradley Walsh
Tom Watt
Barbara Windsor
Wil Wheaton
Letitia Wright
Aurora Aksnes
Sir Ian McKellen

Music

Akala
Natalie Appleton
Nicole Appleton
Arthur Baker
Maleek Berry
Blak Twang
Action Bronson
Bernard Butler
Celeste
Jared Champion
Harry Christophers
Sean Combs
Joel Corry
Roger Daltrey
Dappy
Dave Davies
Ray Davies
Dels
Dido
Alesha Dixon
DJ Fresh
Steve Earle
Eliza
Ella Eyre
Josh Franceschi
JB Gill
David Gilmour
Jess Glynne
Dominic Laurie
Martin Gore
Tony Hadley
Mick Jagger
Jammer
Jay-Z
Jazzie B
J Hus
Judge Jules
Juls
John Keeble
KSI
Labrinth
Lethal Bizzle
Leona Lewis
Little Simz
Chris Lowe
John Lydon
Ella Mai
Chris Martin
Aston Merrygold
Mikill Pane
MoStack
Nafe Smallz
Su-Elise Nash
Nines
Osh
Nerina Pallot
Passenger
Plan B
Professor Green
Rapman
Rihanna
Rodney P
Chris Shiflett
Marcel Somerville
Cat Stevens
Rachel Stevens
Swarmz
The Game
Tinie Tempah
Pete Tong
Untold
Ashley Walters
Roger Waters
Tim Wheeler
Wretch 32
Yizzy

Television and radio personalities

Jeremy Beadle
Jacquie Beltrao
Melvyn Bragg
Nick Bright
Alex Brooker
Steve Bunce
Chunkz
Sarah-Jane Crawford
David Frost
Greg James
Aled Jones
Roman Kemp
Dominic Laurie
Piers Morgan
Dermot Murnaghan
Dermot O'Leary
Robert Peston
Jon Ronson
Jack Saunders
Robert Winston
Dale Winton
Laura Woods
Reggie Yates
Freddie Highmore

Directors and producers

Sean Durkin
Gale Anne Hurd
Atul Kasbekar
Spike Lee
Sam Mendes
Michael Moore
Kyle Newman

Comedians

Rob Beckett
Dara Ó Briain
Alan Davies
Hugh Dennis
Mo Gilligan
Milton Jones
Paul Kaye
Patrick Marber
Rory McGrath
Romesh Ranganathan
Ian Stone
Jack Whitehall
Bilal Zafar

Writers
Paul Gilroy
Maurice Gran
Nick Hornby
Erling Kagge
Laurence Marks
Michael Rosen
Charles Simić

Athletes and sports

Footballers

Tammy Abraham
Gareth Bale
Jack Aitchison
David Alaba
Romeo Beckham
Darren Bent
Christian Benteke
Dennis Bergkamp 
Kevin-Prince Boateng
Yannick Bolasie
Alessandro Costacurta
Denilson
Ben Davis
Matt Doherty
Eduardo
Björn Engels
Mathieu Flamini
Charlie George
Serge Gnabry
Joe Gomez
Karlan Grant
Andre Gray
Perry Groves
Eden Hazard
Tobin Heath
Thierry Henry
Timo Horn
Hulk
Víctor Ibarbo
Andy Impey
Carl Jenkinson
Leon Knight
Mikele Leigertwood
Josh Maja
Diego Maradona
Jackson Martínez
Per Mertesacker
Henrikh Mkhitaryan
Joe Montemurro
Ravel Morrison
Mykhailo Mudryk
Casey Nogueira
Henry Onyekuru
Alex Oxlade-Chamberlain
Emmanuel Petit
Krzysztof Piątek
Florentin Pogba
Paul Pogba
Ferenc Puskás
Nile Ranger
Micah Richards
Emile Smith Rowe
Antonio Rüdiger
Mathew Ryan
Becky Sauerbrunn
George Saunders
Tim Sherwood
Chris Smalling
Daniel Sturridge
Corentin Tolisso
Matt Turner
Ollie Watkins
Arsène Wenger
Leah Williamson
Jack Wilshere
Jonas Wind
Ian Wright
Wilfried Zaha
Oleksandr Zinchenko

American football players
Jay Ajayi
Chad Johnson
Christian McCaffrey
Adam Thielen

Basketball players
Giannis Antetokounmpo
Carmelo Anthony
OG Anunoby
Eric Boateng
Matt Bonner
Jaylen Brown
Luol Deng
Joel Embiid
James Harden
Dirk Nowitzki
Josh Richardson
David Robinson

Boxers
Dan Azeez
Henry Cooper
James DeGale
Audley Harrison
Joe Joyce
Billy Joe Saunders
Michael Watson
Anthony Yarde

Cricketers

James Anderson
Michael Carberry
Nick Compton
Jade Dernbach
Ryan ten Doeschate
Rahul Dravid
Nasser Hussain
Adam Lyth
Monty Panesar
KL Rahul
Mark Ramprakash
Darren Sammy
Virender Sehwag
Sarah Taylor
Phil Tufnell

Golfers
Andrew Johnston
Ian Poulter

Horse racing jockeys
Frankie Dettori
Tony McCoy

Racing cyclists
Tao Geoghegan Hart
Geraint Thomas
Sir Bradley Wiggins

Racing drivers
Lewis Hamilton
Gary Paffett

Tennis players
Harriet Dart
Andy Murray

Track and field athletes

Sir Mo Farah
Allyson Felix
Shelly-Ann Fraser-Pryce
Michael McKillop
Tosin Oke
David Oliver
David Rudisha
Perri Shakes-Drayton
Kelly Sotherton
eSports players

Olof "olofmeister" Gustafsson

Other athletes

Nicklas Bäckström
Ashleigh Ball
Brad Barritt
Will Bayley
Gordon D'Arcy
Harriet Dart
Luke Folwell
Nathan French
Dominic Inglot
Maro Itoje
Luke Jackson
Artturi Lehkonen
Harry Martin
Marc McCarroll
Ugo Monye
Francis Ngannou
Ronnie O'Sullivan
Rob Richardson
Matt Riddle
Chris Robshaw
Greg Rusedski
Richard Sam Bera
Moe Sbihi
Peter Svidler
Warren Tredrea
James Ward
Peter Waterfield
David Weir
Bobby White
Andrey Esipenko

Other sporting figures
Jonathan Barnett
Karren Brady
Kia Joorabchian
Frank Warren

Politicians

Diane Abbott
Abdullah of Pahang
Jennette Arnold
Adama Barrow
John Bercow
Fidel Castro
Sir Nick Clegg
Jeremy Corbyn
Gautam Gambhir
Sam Gyimah
François Hollande
Paul Kagame
Aleksander Kwaśniewski
David Miliband
Raila Odinga
Priti Patel
Chris Patten
Kevin Rudd
Babajide Sanwo-Olu
Keir Starmer

Academics

Other academics
George Carey
Marcus du Sautoy
David Pannick QC

Other individuals

Ronnie Biggs
Osama bin Laden
Richard Blais
Raymond Blanc
Claude Callegari
Dainton Connell
Daniel Ek
Ainsley Harriott
J. P. McManus
Jamie Oliver
Maria Petri
Marcus Samuelsson
The Chicken Connoisseur (Elijah Quashie).

See also
AFTV - YouTube fan channel
Arsenal Supporters' Trust

Notes

References

External links

Supporters
Association football supporters
English football supporters' associations